Stenoalata is a genus of moths in the family Gelechiidae. It contains the species Stenoalata macra, which is found in the Russian Far East (Primorskii krai).

References

Gelechiidae